Kevin M. De Cock, M.D., F.R.C.P. (UK), D.T.M. & H., is Director of the U.S. Centers for Disease Control and Prevention’s (CDC) country mission in Kenya. He has previously served as the team lead for CDC response to Ebola in Liberia, as Director of the CDC Center for Global Health, and as Director of the CDC Division of HIV/AIDS Prevention, Surveillance, and Epidemiology. Dr. De Cock additionally served as the Director of the World Health Organization (WHO) Department of HIV/AIDS from 2006 to 2009, overseeing all of WHO's work related to HIV/AIDS focusing on initiatives to assist low- and middle-income countries in scaling up their treatment, prevention, care, and support programs.

Dr. De Cock received his medical degree from the University of Bristol, United Kingdom. He specialized in internal medicine, completing his residency in Bristol. He obtained the Diploma in Tropical Medicine and Hygiene from the University of Liverpool, United Kingdom, and completed a fellowship in hepatology at the University of Southern California. He joined CDC in 1986 as an Epidemic Intelligence Service Officer working with viral hemorrhagic fevers. Throughout his career, he has served in a variety of positions and medical schools in the United Kingdom, the United States, and sub-Saharan Africa.

References

Sources
 Dr Kevin De Cock starts as the New HIV/AIDS Director at WHO
 The CDC Leaders, Kevin M. De Cock, M.D., F.R.C.P. (UK), D.T.M.&H

Belgian microbiologists
American microbiologists
HIV/AIDS researchers
American public health doctors
World Health Organization officials
Belgian emigrants to the United States
Year of birth missing (living people)
Living people
American officials of the United Nations